The Gascon campaign of 1450-1453 took place during the Hundred Years War when the kingdom of France undertook a military campaign to invade and cede the Duchy of Gascony from the English. Following the decisive victory of the French at the battle of Castillion and after the fall of Bordeaux, the last English stronghold in Gascony, English control of Gascony was removed.

Background
After the fall of Normandy, Charles VII concentrated his efforts on Gascony, the last remaining English province which had been English since 1154, some 300 years.

First Campaign
On the 1st November, French forces defeated an English army at the Battle of Blanquefort. By early 1452 Bordeaux had fallen to the French leaving only the Pale of Calais and the Channel Islands in British authority.

Second Campaign
However, on the 17th October 1452 John Talbot landed in Gascony. Six days later, the city usurped the garrison and Talbot entered the city. By December, most of Western Gascony was under English control, despite a small defeat at the  Battle of Martignas, were 500 archers were ambushed by the Duke of Brabant and the Count of Foix. Charles had been expecting a campaign in Normandy, so he assembled his forces in winter and by early 1453, he was ready. Meanwhile, Talbot had received 3,000 troops from his fourth son  John, Lord Lisle and 2,000 from Gascony, under the command of  Jean de Foix, Earl of Kendal, assembling an army of around 8,000. French forces numbered 10,000.
French forces laid siege to Castillon-la-Bataille and Talbot moved to meet them, with a force of just 500 men-at-arms and 800 archers, expecting the rest of his army, under the Earl of Kendal to reinforce him.
After beating a French detachment of archers near the Castillon Church, Talbot advanced towards the French camp, believing they were retreating ( In fact, the camp followers were leaving for the upcoming battle). Jean Bureau, the french artillery commander had laid out a camp of three hundred cannons.
Talbot, according to an earlier ransom agreement, was the only Englishman mounted and he did not wear armour. As his troops advanced, they were massacred by French cannon. Even though his reinforcements continued to arrive under Kendal, they too suffered the same fate. Despite the odds against the English, the battle lasted over an hour until  the Duke of Brittany led cavalry against their rear and flank. Talbot was killed, possibly after his horse had been killed, a French archer finished him off with a battle axe. Talbot's son Lisle was also killed. Kendal was captured. This battle, the Battle of Castillon and the following Fall of Bordeaux mark the effective end of the war.

References   
Nicolle, David. The Fall of English France 1449–53. Bloomsbury Publishing, 2012. 

1450 in England
1451 in England
1452 in England
1453 in England
1450s in France
Conflicts in 1450
Conflicts in 1451
Conflicts in 1452
Conflicts in 1453
Hundred Years' War, 1415–1453
Gascony
Military campaigns involving France